Daniel La Prevotte (born June 4, 1984) is an American rugby union player. Danny plays flank for San Francisco Golden Gate RFC. He was selected to tour with the USA national rugby union team, the USA Eagles XV, for the Autumn 2010 tour of Europe. Danny is yet to earn a cap playing for the Eagles XV.

See also
Rugby

External links
 Player Profile eaglesxv.com
 Player Profile USA Rugby

1985 births
Living people
American rugby union players
Rugby union flankers